National Highway 48 (NH 48) is a National Highway of India that starts at Delhi and terminates at Chennai traversing through seven states of India. It has a total length of 2807 km (1744 miles). NH 48 passes through the states of Delhi, Haryana, Rajasthan, Gujarat, Maharashtra, Karnataka and Tamil Nadu.

Its stretch from Delhi to Mumbai was earlier designated NH 8 and the stretch between Mumbai and Chennai was designated NH 4 before all the national highways were renumbered in the year 2010.

Route 
The NH 48 bypasses through these important cities and towns that are given below:
 Delhi
 Gurugram
 Rewari
 Behror
 Kotputli
 Shahpura
 Jaipur
 Ajmer
 Rajsamand
 Udaipur
 Himatnagar
Gandhinagar
 Ahmedabad
 Kheda
 Nadiad
 Anand
 Vadodara
 Bharuch
Ankleshwar
 Surat
 Navsari
 Valsad
Vapi
Palghar
 Vasai-Virar
 Mumbai
 Thane
Navi Mumbai
Lonavala
Pimpri Chinchwad
 Pune
 Satara
Karad
 Kolhapur
Nipani
Sankeshwar
 Belgaum
Kittur
Dharwad
 Hubli
 Haveri     
Ranebennuru     
 Davanagere 
 Chitradurga
Hiriyur
Sira
 Tumkur
Dobbaspet
Nelamangala
 Bangalore
Electronic City
Attibele
 Hosur 
 Krishnagiri 
Vaniyambadi 
 Ambur
 Pallikonda
 Vellore
Arcot
 Ranipet
Walajapet
 Kanchipuram
 Sriperumbudur
 Chennai

Junction list

Delhi
 Terminal at Delhi with Rao Tula Marg.

Haryana
  near Gurgaon
 Western Peripheral Expressway - Cloverleaf interchange near Manesar
  - Interchange near Dharuhera
  Interchange near Malhawas, Rewari

Rajasthan

  near Kotputli at Behror
  near Sahpura
  near Manoharpur
  near Chandwaji
  near Jaipur bypass
  near Hirapura
  near Hirapura
  interchange near Kishangarh
  interchange near Nasirabad
  near Gulabpura
  near Mandal
  near Bhilwara
  interchange near Chittorgarh
  near Bhatewar
  near Udaipur
  near Kherwara Chhaoni

Gujarat

  near Himatnagar (58EXT)
  near Prantij (68EXT)
  Roundabout near Chiloda
 Sardar Patel Ring Road at Ranasan Circle, Naroda, Ahmedabad
  near Kheda
  near Nadiad
  near Ahmedabad
  Interchange near Ahmedabad
  near Anand
  Interchange near Vadodara
  near Vadodara
  near Palsana, Surat
  near Chikli
  near Pardi
  near Vapi
  near Bhilad

Maharashtra

  near Thane
  near Talasari
  near Manor
  near Thane 
 Mumbai–Pune Expressway  near Kalamboli
  near Kalamboli
  near Palspe
  near Panvel
 Mumbai–Pune Expressway Interchange near Arivali village
  near Chowk Gaon
 Mumbai–Pune Expressway Interchange near Kusgaon
  near Talegaon Dabhade
  near Dehu Road, Pune
 Mumbai–Pune Expressway Dehu Road Interchange (Terminal point of MPE)
  near Pune
  near Pune
  near New Katraj Tunnel, Pune
  near Shirwal
  near Wade Phata, Satara
  near Satara
  near Karad
  near Peth Islampur
  near Kolhapur
  near Kolhapur

Karnataka

  near Sankeshwar
  near Sankeshwar - Gotur
  near Belgaum
  near Dharwad
  Interchange near Hubli
  Interchange near Hubli
  near Haveri
  near Ranibennuru
  near Chitradurga
  near Chitradurga
  near Hiriyur
  near Sira
  near Sira
  near Tumkur
  near Dobbaspet
  near Nelamangala
  near Bangalore
  near Bangalore
 NICE Road Interchange near Electronic City

Tamil Nadu

  near Hosur
  near Krishnagiri
  near Vaniyambadi
  near Pallikonda
  near Vellore
  near Ranipet
  near Kanchipuram
  Terminal near Chennai

Map with spur routes

See also 
 List of National Highways in India
 List of National Highways in India by state
 National Highways Development Project
 National Highway 169 (India)
 National Highway 66 (India)

References

External links 

 NH 48 on OpenStreetMap

National highways in India
National Highways in Delhi
National Highways in Haryana
National Highways in Rajasthan
National Highways in Gujarat
National Highways in Maharashtra
National Highways in Karnataka
National Highways in Tamil Nadu
Transport in Delhi
Transport in Chennai